A.-M. Julien, real name Aman-Julien Maistre, (24 July 1903 – 15 January 2001) was a French actor, singer and theatre manager.

He was François Maistre's father.

Life 
Born in Toulon (Var), Julien joined the troupe of the Copiaus founded by Jacques Copeau in the 1920s and which became the Compagnie des Quinze (1930-1932) in 1929 when it was installed at the Théâtre du Vieux-Colombier in Paris. It is within this group that he met a Swiss actor, singer and composer Jean Villard Gilles, known as Gilles, with whom he created a vocal duo from 1932 to 1939, under the name "Gilles and Julien", which met with great success.

From 1947 to 1966, he directed the Théâtre Sarah-Bernhardt, where he founded the Festival d'Art dramatique de Paris in 1954 (renamed "Théâtre des Nations" in 1957), thanks to which he made the Parisian public discover, among others Bertolt Brecht's Berliner Ensemble and Giorgio Strehler's Piccolo Teatro di Milano.

In this capacity, he chaired the jury of the International singing competition of Toulouse on 2 occasions.

Julien died in Millau (Aveyron).

Selected appearances 
 1935: Monsieur Sans-Gêne
 1941: 
 1944:  by Léo Joannon
 1967: , Marcel Pagnol's Topaze, staged by Marcelle Tassencourt, directed by Pierre Sabbagh, Théâtre Marigny
 1969: Jacquou le Croquant, miniseries by Stellio Lorenzi

References

External links 
 A.-Julien on "Les Archives du spectacle"
 

1903 births
2001 deaths
Actors from Toulon
20th-century French male  singers
20th-century French male actors
French theatre managers and producers
Directors of the Paris Opera
Musicians from Toulon